Thoracocharax securis, the giant hatchetfish, is a hatchetfish found in the Amazon River Basin. Adults will grow up to 6.8 cm in the wild and 9 cm in the aquarium. It is a  rarely seen species in the aquarium hobby. It is known to glide up to 2.74 meters (9 ft) out of the water.

Aquarium care
Thoracocharax securis should be kept in group of at least 5 individuals. The minimum aquarium volume for such a group is 150 L.

References

http://eol.org/pages/217344/overview

http://www.fishbase.org/summary/Thoracocharax-securis.html

Gasteropelecidae
Fish of South America
Thoracocharax
Fish described in 1853
Taxa named by Filippo De Filippi